In December 2020, the International Union for Conservation of Nature (IUCN) listed 798 vulnerable avian species. Of all evaluated avian species, 7.3% are listed as vulnerable. 
No subpopulations of birds have been evaluated by the IUCN.

For a species to be assessed as vulnerable to extinction the best available evidence must meet quantitative criteria set by the IUCN designed to reflect "a high risk of extinction in the wild". Endangered and critically endangered species also meet the quantitative criteria of vulnerable species, and are listed separately. See: List of endangered birds, List of critically endangered birds. Vulnerable, endangered and critically endangered species are collectively referred to as threatened species by the IUCN.

Additionally, 53 avian species (0.48% of those evaluated) are listed as data deficient, meaning there is insufficient information for a full assessment of conservation status. As these species typically have small distributions and/or populations, they are intrinsically likely to be threatened, according to the IUCN. While the category of data deficient indicates that no assessment of extinction risk has been made for the taxa, the IUCN notes that it may be appropriate to give them "the same degree of attention as threatened taxa, at least until their status can be assessed".

This is a complete list of vulnerable avian species evaluated by the IUCN. Where possible common names for taxa are given while links point to the scientific name used by the IUCN.

Mesites

Penguins

Procellariiformes
Procellariiformes includes petrels and albatrosses. There are 30 species in the order Procellariiformes assessed as vulnerable.

Albatrosses

Procellariids

Storm petrels
Matsudaira's storm petrel
Monteiro's storm petrel

Gruiformes
There are 26 species in the order Gruiformes assessed as vulnerable.

Trumpeters
Dark-winged trumpeter

Cranes

Rallids

Bustards

Parrots
There are 53 parrot species assessed as vulnerable.

Cockatoos
Salmon-crested cockatoo
Blue-eyed cockatoo

Psittacids

Suliformes

Pigeons and doves

Pelecaniformes

Galliformes
There are 46 species in the order Galliformes assessed as vulnerable.

Cracids

Megapodes

Phasianids

New World quails

Guineafowl species
White-breasted guineafowl

Struthioniformes

Bucerotiformes

Accipitriformes

Accipitriformes includes most of the diurnal birds of prey. There are more than 20 species in the order Accipitriformes assessed as vulnerable.

Accipitrids

Anseriformes

Anatids

Owls
There are 27 owl species assessed as vulnerable.

Barn-owls

Strigidae

Charadriiformes

Falconiformes

Coraciiformes

Passerines
There are 337 passerine species assessed as vulnerable.

Monarch flycatchers

Finches

Pittas

Formicariids

White-eyes

Cotingas

Thrushes

Corvids

Antbirds

Icterids

New World warblers

Ovenbirds

Sylviids

Emberizids

Old World babblers

Old World flycatchers

Ploceids

Bulbuls

Tanagers

Manakins

Swallows

Tyrant flycatchers

Honeyeaters

Estrildid finches

Other passerine species

Caprimulgiformes

Cuckoos

Piciformes

Other bird species

See also 
 Lists of IUCN Red List vulnerable species
 List of least concern birds
 List of near threatened birds
 List of endangered birds
 List of critically endangered birds
 List of extinct bird species since 1500
 List of data deficient birds

References 

Birds
Vulnerable birds
Vulnerable birds
Bird conservation